Propyl iodide may refer to:

 n-Propyl iodide
 Isopropyl iodide